The United States Information Agency (USIA), which operated from 1953 to 1999, was a United States government agency devoted to the practice of public diplomacy. In 1999, prior to the reorganization of intelligence agencies by President George W. Bush, President Bill Clinton assigned USIA's cultural exchange and non-broadcasting intelligence functions to the newly created under secretary of state for public diplomacy and public affairs at the U.S. Department of State. USIA's broadcasting functions were moved to the newly created Broadcasting Board of Governors. The agency was previously known overseas as the United States Information Service (USIS), operating out of U.S. embassies worldwide. Since the merger of USIA with the Department of State, public diplomacy and public affairs sections at U.S. missions have carried on this work.

Former USIA Director of TV and Film Service Alvin Snyder recalled in his 1995 memoir that "the U.S. government ran a full-service public relations organization, the largest in the world, about the size of the twenty biggest U.S. commercial PR firms combined. Its full-time professional staff of more than 10,000, spread out among some 150 countries, burnished America‘s image and trashed the Soviet Union 2,500 hours a week with a 'tower of babble'  more than 70 languages, to the tune of over $2 billion per year". The USIA was "the biggest branch of this propaganda machine."

Stated mission

President Dwight D. Eisenhower established the United States Information Agency in 1953, during the postwar tensions with the communist world known as the Cold War. The USIA's mission was "to understand, inform and influence foreign publics in promotion of the national interest, and to broaden the dialogue between Americans and U.S. institutions, and their counterparts abroad". The USIA was established "to streamline the U.S. government's overseas information programs, and make them more effective". The USIA was the largest full-service public relations organization in the world, spending over $2 billion per year to highlight the views of the U.S. while diminishing those of the Soviet Union, through about 150 different countries.

Its stated goals were to explain and advocate U.S. policies in terms that are credible and meaningful in foreign cultures; to provide information about the official policies of the United States, and about the people, values and institutions which influence those policies; to bring the benefits of international engagement to American citizens and institutions by helping them build strong long-term relationships with their counterparts overseas; and to advise the President and U.S. government policy-makers on the ways in which foreign attitudes would have a direct bearing on the effectiveness of U.S. policies.

During the Cold War, some American officials believed that a propaganda program was essential to convey the United States and its culture and politics to the world, and to offset negative Soviet propaganda against the US. With heightened fears about the influence of communism, some Americans believed that the films produced by the Hollywood movie industry, when critical of American society, damaged its image in other countries. The USIA "exist[ed] as much to provide a view of the world to the United States as it [did] to give the world a view of America". Films produced by the USIA could by law not be screened publicly within the United States. This restriction also meant that Americans could not view the material even for study at the National Archives.

Within the US, the USIA was intended to assure Americans that "[t]he United States was working for a better world". Abroad, the USIA tried to preserve a positive image of the U.S. regardless of negative depictions from communist propaganda. One notable example was Project Pedro. This secretly funded project created newsreels in Mexico during the 1950s that portrayed Communism unfavorably and the United States positively. Articles reflecting the views promoted by the USIA were frequently published under fictitious bylines, such as "Guy Sims Fitch".

The agency regularly conducted research on foreign public opinion about the United States and its policies, in order to inform the president and other key policymakers. It conducted public opinion surveys throughout the world. It issued a variety of reports to government officials, including a twice-daily report on foreign media commentary around the world.

Media and divisions

From the beginning, President Dwight Eisenhower said that "audiences would be more receptive to the American message if they were kept from identifying it as propaganda. Avowedly propagandistic materials from the United States might convince few, but the same viewpoints presented by the seemingly independent voices would be more persuasive." The USIA used various forms of media, including "personal contact, radio broadcasting, libraries, book publication and distribution, press motion pictures, television, exhibits, English-language instruction, and others". Through these different forms, the United States government distributed its materials more easily and engaged a greater concentration of people.

Four main divisions were established when the USIA began its programs.
 Broadcasting information
 Libraries and exhibits
 Press services
 Motion picture service

The first division dealt with broadcasting information, both in the United States and around the world. The radio was one of the most widely used forms of media at the onset of the Cold War, as television was not widely available. The Smith–Mundt Act authorized information programs, including Voice of America. Voice of America was intended as an unbiased and balanced "Voice from America", as originally broadcast during World War II. The VOA was used to "tell America's stories ... to information deprived listeners behind the Iron Curtain". By 1967, the VOA was broadcasting in 38 languages to up to 26 million listeners. In 1976 VOA gained its "Charter", requiring its news to be balanced.

The second division of the USIA consisted of libraries and exhibits. The Smith–Mundt Act and the Fulbright–Hays Act of 1961 both authorized international cultural and educational exchanges (including the Fulbright Scholarship Program). USIA would mount exhibitions in its libraries overseas to reach people in other countries. "Fulbrighters" were grant recipients under the USIA educational and cultural exchange program. To ensure that those grant programs would be fair and unbiased, persons of educational and cultural expertise in the grant subject areas selected the grantee recipients.

The USIA's third division included press services. Within its first two decades, the "USIA publishe[d] sixty-six magazines, newspapers, and other periodicals, totaling almost 30 million copies annually, in twenty-eight languages".

The fourth division dealt with the motion picture service. After the USIA failed in its effort to collaborate with Hollywood filmmakers to portray America in a positive light, the agency began producing their own documentaries.

Non-broadcast educational and information efforts 
By the time the agency was reorganized in 1999, the educational and informational efforts encompassed a wide range of activities, outside of broadcasting. These were focused in four areas, the agency produced extensive electronic and printed materials.
 Information service
 Speakers and Specialists Program
 Information Resource Centers
 Foreign press centers

Its The Washington File information service, was intended to provide, in the words of the agency "both time-sensitive and in-depth information in five languages", incorporating full transcripts of speeches, Congressional testimony, articles by Administration officials, and materials providing analysis of key issues. The Agency also ran a number of websites to transmit information.

Second, the agency ran a "Speakers and Specialists Program", sending Americans abroad for various public speaking and technical assistance roles. These speakers were referred to as "American Participants" or "AmParts".

Third, the agency operated more than 100 "Information Resource Centers" abroad. These included some public-access libraries in developing countries.

Finally, the USIA-operated foreign press centers in Washington, New York, and Los Angeles to "assist resident and visiting foreign journalists". In other major American cities, such as Chicago, Houston, Atlanta, Miami, and Seattle, the USIA worked cooperatively with other international press centers.

Beginning with the 1958 Brussels World Fair, the USIA directed the design, construction, and operation of the U.S. pavilions representing the United States at major world Expos.

Abolition and restructuring
The Foreign Affairs Reform and Restructuring Act of 1998, Division G of the Omnibus Consolidated and Emergency Supplemental Appropriations Act, 1999, abolished the U.S. Information Agency effective October 1, 1999. Its information and cultural exchange functions were folded into the Department of State under the newly created Under Secretary of State for Public Diplomacy and Public Affairs.

When dismantled, the agency budget was $1.109 billion. After reductions of staff in 1997, the agency had 6,352 employees, of which almost half were civil service employees in the United States (2,521). About 1,800 of these employees worked in international broadcasting, while approximately 1,100 worked on the agency's educational and informational programs, such as the Fulbright program. Foreign service officers comprised about 1,000 members of the work force. Broadcasting functions, including Voice of America, Radio and TV Marti, Radio Free Europe (in Eastern Europe), Radio Free Asia, and Radio Liberty (in Russia and other areas of the former Soviet Union), were consolidated as an independent entity under the Broadcasting Board of Governors (BBG). This continues to operate independently from the State Department. In the late 1990s and early 2000s, some commentators characterized United States international broadcasters, such as Radio Free Asia, Radio Free Europe, and Voice of America as United States propaganda.<ref>{{cite journal |last=Hopkins |first=Mark |title=A Babel of Broadcasts |journal=Columbia Journalism Review |volume=38 |issue=2 |year=1999 |page=44 |url=https://go.gale.com/ps/anonymous?id=GALE%7CA55292344 |issn=0010-194X|quote='The U.S. is propagandizing the world with a jumble of wasteful, redundant radio and TV programs – Voice of America, Radio Free This-and-That.}}</ref>

See also
 WORLDNET Television and Film Service
 Committee on Public Information
 Crusade for Freedom
 Cultural diplomacy
 Clandestine HUMINT operational techniquesNine from Little Rock, an Academy Award-winning documentary by Charles Guggenheim, commissioned by the USIA
 U.S. Department of State's Bureau of International Information Programs
 Foreign Broadcast Information Service
 Arthur Kimball, initial, acting, director of the agency
 Leo P. Ribuffo

References

Further reading
 Bardos, Arthur, "'Public Diplomacy': An Old Art, a New Profession", Virginia Quarterly Review, Summer 2001
 Bogart, Leo, Premises For Propaganda: The United States Information Agency's Operating Assumptions in the Cold War, 
 Cull, Nicholas J. "The Cold War and the United States Information Agency: American Propaganda and Public Diplomacy, 1945–1989", 
 Gerits, Frank, “Taking Off the Soft Power Lens: The United States Information Service in Cold War Belgium, 1950–1958,” Journal of Belgian History 42 (Dec. 2012), 10–49.
 Snow, Nancy, Propaganda, Inc.: Selling America's Culture to the World, 
 Kiehl, William P. (ed.) "America's Dialogue with the World", 
 Sorensen, Thomas C. "Word War: The Story of American Propaganda" (1968)  
 Tobia, Simona "Advertising America. The United States Information Service in Italy (1945–1956)", LED Edizioni Universitarie, 
 United States Information Agency, Commemoration Booklet Public Diplomacy: Looking Forward, Looking Back, Commemorative volume, 1999
Yoshida, Yukihiko, Jane Barlow and Witaly Osins, ballet teachers who worked in postwar Japan, and their students'', Pan-Asian Journal of Sports & Physical Education, Vol.3(Sep), 2012.

External links

 Records of the United States Information Agency (USIA) in the National Archives
 Archive of agency Web site
 Papers of Abbott Washburn (Special Assistant to the Director of the USIA, 1953 & Deputy Director of the USIA, 1953–1961), Dwight D. Eisenhower Presidential Library 
 

1953 establishments in the United States
1999 disestablishments in the United States
Defunct agencies of the United States government
Government agencies established in 1953
Government agencies disestablished in 1999
United States Department of State
United States government propaganda organizations
Public relations in the United States
Anti-communist organizations in the United States
American propaganda during the Cold War